Route 210, also known as the Burin Peninsula Highway and Heritage Run, is a highway that extends through the Burin Peninsula from Goobies to Grand Bank, Newfoundland and Labrador.  The maximum speed limit is 90 km/h except through communities and settlements where the speed limit is reduced to 50 km/h.  Just after exiting Swift Current, until a few kilometres north of Marystown, much of the landscape is barren, with very few trees prevalent.  After entering Marystown, motorists approach a junction where they could turn right to continue their journey on Route 210 until arriving at Grand Bank, or going straight onto Route 220 towards Burin and St. Lawrence. Marystown is the most populous community along the route.

Route description

Route 210 begins in Goobies at an intersection with Route 1 (Trans-Canada Highway) and it heads west through downtown and some neighbourhoods before leaving town and crossing a river. The highway heads southwest through rural areas for several kilometres to have intersections with local roads leading to North Harbour (also known as Goose Cove) and Garden Cove. Route 210 now passes through Black River, where it crosses a river of the same name, and Swift Current before paralleling and crossing another river and passing through more rural terrain for several kilometres. It now heads further southwest as it has intersections with Route 214 (Monkstown Road), Route 211 (English Harbour East Road), Route 212 (Bay L'Argent Road), and Route 215 (Petit Forte Road). A ferry to Rencontre East can be accessed via Route 212 and a ferry to South East Bight can be accessed via Route 215. The highway now follows the coastline in the distance as it meets local roads leading to Parkers Cove, Baine Harbour, Rushoon, Red Harbour, Jean de Baie, Spanish Room, Rock Harbour, and Mooring Cove before entering the Marystown town limits. Route 210 passes south through some neighbourhoods before entering a business district and coming to an intersection with Route 220A (Creston Boulevard). Route 210 now makes a sharp right turn and heads west to have partial interchange with Harris Drive before passing through more neighbourhoods and having an intersection with Route 220 (Creston Causeway). Route 210 now leaves Marystown and crosses over a lake before passing through Winterland, where it meets Route 222 (Salt Pond-Winterland Road). The highway now passes through rural areas for several kilometres, where it has two intersections with Route 213 (East and West Access) before following the northern coastline of the peninsula to pass through Grand Beach, Molliers, and L'Anse-au-Loup before entering Grand Bank, where Route 210 transitions to Route 220 at an intersection with Marine Drive.

Major intersections

See also 

List of Newfoundland and Labrador highways

References

210